Autumn Roses is a 1931  Argentine short musical film directed by Eduardo Morera.

Gardel's musical short films from 1930 
In 1930 Gardel starred in fifteen sound musical short films, each one about a song, directed by Eduardo Morera and produced by Federico Valle, one of the pioneers of Latin American cinema. Valle was born in Italy in 1880, and after working with the Lumière Brothers and taking classes with Georges Méliès, he emigrated to Argentina in 1911 and since then has produced dozens of highly valuable cinematographic works, including the first newsreels and animated feature films of Quirino Cristiani, the first in the history of world cinema of its kind.

Of the fifteen shorts, five were ruined in the laboratory, including one entitled Leguisamo solo, in which the jockey Irineo Leguisamo appeared, and another entitled El quinielero. The ten short films released were: El carroro, Longing, Autumn roses, Hand in hand, Yira, yira, I'm afraid, Padrino pelao, Enfundá la mandolina, Canchero and Viejo tuxedo.

References

External links
 

1931 films
1930s Spanish-language films
1931 musical films
Argentine short films
Films directed by Eduardo Morera
Argentine black-and-white films
Argentine musical films
1930s Argentine films